Talış , T’alish or Talish  may refer to:

Talış, Agsu, Azerbaijan
Talış, Hajigabul, Azerbaijan
Talış, Ismailli, Azerbaijan
Talış, Quba, Azerbaijan
Talış, Shamkir, Azerbaijan
Talış, Tartar, Azerbaijan

See also
Talesh (disambiguation)
Talish (disambiguation)
Talysh (disambiguation)